Bangalore Open Air (BOA) is India's only dedicated Heavy metal open air music festival which takes place yearly in Bangalore, India. The 8th edition of the festival in collaboration with Wacken Open Air took place in February 2019.  In the past  the festival has also hosted The Wacken Metal Battle's Indian leg—with the winning band getting an opportunity to play at Wacken Open Air in Germany. India is the 27th Country to participate in the W:O:A Metal Battle since 2011. In its latest edition (2019) the festival expanded the hosting of The Wacken Metal Battle to other Indian subcontinent countries namely: Nepal, Sri Lanka and Bangladesh in addition to India.

Lineups

2012
The First Edition of the festival took place on 16 June 2012. It was headlined by German thrash metal band Kreator.

2013
The Second Edition of the festival took place at Jayamahal Palace on 6 July 2013 and involved bands and artistes from eclectic genres of Heavy Metal. It was headlined by American metal band Iced Earth and Swedish melodic death metal band Dark Tranquillity.

The event took place at Jayamahal Palace on 6 July 2013.

2014

The Third Edition of the festival took place on 13 September 2014 and was headlined by Destruction and Rotting Christ. For the first time in the history of Heavy Metal Music the concept of crowd funding was adopted to fund a percentage of the festival.

The 4th Edition of the Wacken Open Air Metal Battle, India presented by Bangalore Open Air was held from 19 April to 27 April. The prelims of the competition were held in Bangalore, Chennai, Hyderabad, Mumbai, Guwahati & Kolkata.

2015

The 4th Edition of the festival now renamed G-Shock Bangalore Open Air was held on 6 June 2015.

2016

The 5th Edition of the festival was held on 9 July 2016 at Royal Orchid Resorts, Yelahanka, Bangalore.

2017
The 6th and most successful edition of G-Shock Bangalore Open Air was held on 1 July 2017 at Royal Orchid Resorts, Yelahanka, Bangalore( the third consecutive time at the same location.) The lineup consisted of bands from the sub genres of: Death Metal, Thrash metal, and Speed Metal.

2018

The 7th anniversary edition of G-Shock Bangalore Open Air was held on 7 July 2018 at Aadya Farms and Leisure Resorts, Yelahanka, Bangalore. This edition marked the maiden show of American thrash metal titans Overkill in India along with American death metal band Immolation and French post metal band Alcest, who brought their unique blackgaze sound to India after attempting do so since 2013.

2019

The 8th edition of G-Shock Bangalore Open Air held on 9 February 2019 at Aadya Farms and Leisure Resorts, Yelahanka, Bangalore. Headlining acts include: Black metal giants Abbath and New York Technical death metal outfit Suffocation. On the day of the event the 4 winners of the regional editions of Wacken Metal Battle 2019 from the Indian subcontinent countries: Krur (Nepal), Mass Damnation (Sri Lanka), Trainwreck (Bangladesh), Nephele (India) compete to play for a coveted slot at the Wacken Open Air metal battle in Germany.

2020 
The 9th edition of Bangalore Open Air was scheduled for 21 March 2020. The organizers announced a new venue: Ramada by Wyndham in Yelahanka, a four star resort in Bangalore.

References

Heavy metal festivals in India
Rock festivals in India
Culture of Bangalore
Festivals in Karnataka
Events in Bangalore